The 2010–11 Championnat de France amateur was the 13th edition since its establishment. Colmar were the defending champions. Due to the elongated appeals process involving each clubs' eligibility, the groups and fixtures were unveiled to the public on 15 July 2010 and the season began on 7 August and ended on 28 May 2011. The winter break was in effect between 18 December and 15 January 2011. There were 12 promoted teams from the Championnat de France amateur 2, replacing the 13 teams that were relegated from the Championnat de France amateur following the 2009–10 season. A total of 69 teams currently competes in the league with 12 clubs suffering relegation to the fifth division, the Championnat de France amateur 2. All non-reserve clubs that secured league status for the season were subject to approval by the DNCG before becoming eligible to participate in the competition.

On 7 May 2011, despite having the week off, Le Poiré-sur-Vie became the first club from the Championnat de France amateur to achieve promotion from the fourth division to the Championnat National. The club's spot in the third division was confirmed following second-place Les Herbiers' 0–0 draw with the reserve team of professional club Lorient. Two weeks later, both Besançon and Gazélec Ajaccio were promoted to the Championnat National after recording victories during the match day. Gazélec Ajaccio result also rewarded the club the honour of being the champion of the Championnat de France amateur. On the final day of the season, Quevilly became the final club in the CFA to earn promotion to National after drawing with Poissy.

Changes in 2010–11

Promotion and relegation 
Teams relegated to Championnat de France amateur
 Moulins
 Hyères
 Louhans-Cuiseaux

Teams promoted to Championnat de France amateur
 Aubervilliers
 Avion
 Belfort
 Béziers
 Lorient Reserves
 Metz Reserves
 AS Monaco Reserves
 Monts d'Or Azergues
 Le Poiré-sur-Vie
 Poissy
 Saint-Étienne Reserves
 Saint-Pryvé Saint-Hilaire
 Tarbes Pyrénées Football
 Uzès Pont du Gard

DNCG rulings 
On 15 June 2010, following a review of each club's administrative and financial accounts in the Championnat de France amateur, the DNCG ruled that Besançon RC, Hyères FC, CS Louhans-Cuiseaux, FC Montceau Bourgogne, EDS Montluçon, Olympique Noisy-le-Sec, and RCF Paris would be relegated to the Championnat de France amateur 2. The organization also ruled that newly promoted club Calais RUFC would be excluded from ascending up to the fourth division, while SO Cassis Carnoux, which had been relegated to the CFA from the Championnat National, would also be excluded from the league. The second place club in Calais' group, CMS Oissel, who was set to replace Calais was also denied promotion to the Championnat de France amateur. All clubs had the option to appeal the decision.

On 2 July, local media in Alsace reported that Strasbourg were on the verge of being relegated to the Championnat de France amateur by the DNCG due to financial issues. The club responded by announcing its willingness to appeal if the news reported was confirmed. With the club's accounts still being reviewed, Strasbourg's financial issues were slightly alleviated after the sale of striker Magaye Gueye to English club Everton for €1.4 million. Strasbourg later transferred captain Guillaume Lacour and Algerian international Yacine Bezzaz to Évian and Troyes, respectively, for nominal fees. On 16 July, the report was confirmed when the DNCG officially relegated Strasbourg to the CFA. Strasbourg appealed the decision the following week. On 22 July, Strasbourg's appeal was successful with the DNCG ruling in favor of a return to National.

On 7 July, Besançon, Hyères, and Oissel's appeals were heard by the DNCG Appeals Committee and, following deliberation and explanations from each club, the committee ruled in favor of Besançon, but upheld the appeals of Hyères and Oissel. The following day, the appeals committee granted both Louhans-Cuiseaux and Noisy-le-Sec appeals to stay in the fourth division. The committee, however, upheld the rulings of Calais, Montceau Bourgogne, Montluçon, and Racing Paris.

League tables

Group A

Results

Group B

Results

Group C

Results

Group D

Results

Playoffs

Semi-finals

Final

Top goalscorers 
Last updated: 7 March 2011

References

External links 
 CFA Official Page
 CFA Standings and Statistics 

 

Championnat National 2 seasons
4
France